Francis Marvin (March 8, 1828 – August 14, 1905) was a U.S. Representative from New York.

Born in New York City, Marvin attended the public schools in Port Jervis, Orange County.
He entered upon a commercial career and engaged in the promotion, construction, and operation of railroads, water-supply companies, bridges, manufacture of illuminating gas, and in banking.
Postmaster of Port Jervis in 1851.
He was in the Justice of the Peace in the town of Deerpark in 1852.
He was employed as bookkeeper in a bank in 1856.
He was an unsuccessful candidate of the Republican Party for member of the assembly in 1864 and for the State senate in 1881.
He was president of the village of Port Jervis in 1865.

Marvin was elected as a Republican to the Fifty-third Congress (March 4, 1893 – March 3, 1895).
He declined to be a candidate for renomination in 1894 and devoted his time to the management of his several business enterprises.
He died in Port Jervis, New York, August 14, 1905.
He was interred in Laurel Grove Cemetery.

Sources

1828 births
1905 deaths
People from Port Jervis, New York
Republican Party members of the United States House of Representatives from New York (state)
19th-century American politicians